The International Journal of Epidemiology is a bimonthly peer-reviewed medical journal covering research in epidemiology. It is the official journal of the International Epidemiological Association and is published by Oxford University Press. The journal is a member of the Committee on Publication Ethics. The editor-in-chief is Stephen Leeder (University of Sydney).

History
The journal was established in 1972 by the International Epidemiological Association to facilitate communication among its members and all those engaged in research, teaching and the application of epidemiology. The first editor-in-chief, Walter W. Holland, hoped to "overcome some of the problems of publication of epidemiological work in local journals, which often tend to be unavailable to workers outside that country" and to "create an international viewpoint of health problems."

Editors
The following persons are or have been editors-in-chief:
1972–1977: Walter W. Holland
1978–1981: A.E. Bennett
1982–1990: Charles du Vé Florey
1991–2000: Peter O.D. Pharoah
2001–2016: George Davey Smith and Shah Ebrahim
2017–present: Stephen Leeder

Abstracting and indexing
The journal is abstracted and indexed by:

According to the Journal Citation Reports, the journal has a 2021 impact factor of 9.685.

References

External links

Epidemiology journals
Oxford University Press academic journals
Bimonthly journals
Publications established in 1972
English-language journals
Academic journals associated with international learned and professional societies